Loren is both a given name and surname.

Loren or Løren may also refer to:

 Løren Line, Norwegian line of the Oslo Metro
 Løren (station), Norwegian underground rapid transit station of the Oslo Metro
 Loren River, Russia
 Loren Bridge, spanning the river
 Loren Nunataks, Queen Elizabeth Land, Antarctica
 Lorenzo Jesús Morón García (born 1993), Spanish footballer known as Loren
 Lorenzo Juarros García (born 1966), Spanish retired footballer known as Loren
 Lorenzo Morón (born 1970), Spanish retired footballer and manager known as Loren
 Loren (kickboxer), Spanish kickboxer Lorenzo Javier Jorge (born 1984)
 Løren (musician), South Korean musician (born January 10, 1995)

See also
 Lorena (disambiguation)
 Lorene (given name)
 Loreen (disambiguation)
 Loran (disambiguation)